Antinaturalism, or anti-naturalism, is a movement arguing against naturalist and essentialist ideology; it is associated with antispeciesism, anti-racism, and feminism. Its philosophy is closely linked to the French animal rights movement and is also supported by xenofeminists, who advocate for a form of feminism holding that if nature is unjust, it should be changed, as well as transhumanists. Notable advocates include David Olivier and Yves Bonnardel.

Philosophy 
Antinaturalists defend the inherent and absolute moral permissibility of abortion, body modification, divorce, contraception, sex reassignment surgery, and other means by which they believe human beings can assume control of their own bodies and their own environments. 

Antinaturalism stands in contrast to some radical environmentalist movements, which state that nature itself is sacred and should be preserved for its own sake; instead it advances the idea that all human acts are natural and that ecological preservation is important inasmuch as it is necessary for the well-being of sentient beings, not because of some inherently sacred attribute of nature as a whole. Yves Bonnardel argues that naturalist ideology "goes hand in hand with and legitimises speciesist oppression of non-human sentient beings", and that using natural law to justify the reintroduction of predatory animals to control populations of other animals is a form of speciesism.

See also 
 Appeal to nature
 Gender essentialism
 Morphological freedom
 Predation problem
 Wild animal suffering

References 

 Stéphane Haber (2006). Critique de l'antinaturalisme. Études sur Foucault, Butler, Habermas ("Critique of Antinaturalism. Studies on Foucault, Butler, Habermas"). France University Press (1, 2).

Animal rights movement
Feminist movements and ideologies
Transhumanism